This is a list of characters in the Spanish webcomic Raruto. They are parodies of Naruto characters, and many of their names have double meanings in Spanish and/or are references to other anime and manga series. In Raruto the family names of characters go before their given names, reflecting the ordering of Japanese personal names as expressed in the Japanese language.

Characters

Characters from Torroja

 Zumomaki Raruto - Raruto is a boy from Torroja village who possesses a demon fox inside of him. He is a parody of Naruto Uzumaki. Jesulink named the character "Raruto" because The Legend of Zelda: The Wind Waker has a character named in the Japanese version "Sage Raruto." Jesulink chose the name "Raruto" because The Legend of Zelda series video games are his favorite video games. In Spanish "zumo" means "juice." The translator says that "Zumomaki" "makes no sense..."
 Kuchilla Saske - A parody of Sasuke Uchiha, Saske says that he hates "everything, white rice above all." The name "Saske" originates from "Sasuke" of the original character, and is pronounced the same as the name of the original character. In Spanish "cuchilla" means "blade."
 Margarina Flora - A parody of Sakura Haruno. In Spanish "Flora" refers to plants, and a "flor" is a flower. The character's name refers to the original character's name, "Sakura," meaning "cherry blossom" in Japanese. In Spanish "Margarina" means "margarine," and a brand of margarine in Spain is "Margarina Flora."
 Kagate Kakasi (Kágate Kakasí) - A parody of Kakashi Hatake. In Spanish "caca" refers to feces and "sí" means yes, so his name means "yes, poopoo." In Spanish "cagate" means to defecate.
 Sinyaya - A parody of Jiraiya. The name "sinyaya" in Spanish means "without a grandmother," and in Spanish the saying about not having a grandmother is the Spanish way of saying that one is "blowing his/her horn."
 Afuma - A parody of Sarutobi Asuma. In Spanish "Fuma" means "he smokes."
 Clara Pichamaru - A parody of Shikamaru Nara. In Spanish "picha" is slang for a penis, and Pichamaru has a large penis. "Clara" in Spanish means "clear," which one would use to say that an egg is white.
 Achimichi Gordi - A parody of Choji Akimichi. In Spanish "Gordi" means "fatty."
 Yamaja Chino - A parody of Ino Yamanaka. The name "chino" means Chinese. The translator said "It makes no sense." The author liked how the name sounded. "Yamaja" sounds similar to the Yamaha motorbike brand.
 Ron-Li - A parody of Rock Lee. In Spanish "Ron" means rum, so he has "the name of a drunkard."
 Guay - A parody of Might Guy. In Spanish "guay" means "cool."
 Lechuga Benji - A parody of Neji Hyuga. "Benji" refers to "Benji Price," the Spanish name of "Genzo Wakabayashi" in the anime version of Captain Tsubasa. "Lechuga" in Spanish means "lettuce."
 Lechuga Tinaja - A parody of Hinata Hyuga. "Tinaja" means "earthenware jar." "Lechuga" in Spanish means "lettuce."
 Diezdiez - A parody of Tenten. "Diez" means the number 10 in Spanish.
 Churrenai - A parody of Kurenai Yuhi. The name refers to a "churro," a Spanish breakfast food.
 Inurruta Simba and Kakamaru - Simba is a parody of Kiba Inuzuka, and Kakamaru is a parody of Akamaru. Simba's name refers to the character "Simba" from The Lion King. "Inurruta" is a corruption of "Inuzuka" that has no intended meaning. In Spanish "caca" refers to feces, and "caca" is referenced in Kakamaru's name.
 Ablame Nino - A parody of Shino Aburame. In Spanish "Hablame" means "Talk to me."
 Lechuga Jirachi - A parody of Hiashi Hyuga. The name is a reference to the Pokémon Jirachi.
 Lechuga Ananibi - A parody of Hanabi Hyuga. The name "Ananibi," meaning "I love you, darling," refers to a Spanish song.
 Lechuga Mariachi - A parody of Hirachi Hyuga. The name refers to a mariachi.
 Yamaja Chinorro - The father of Yamaja Chino, he is a parody of Inoichi Yamanaka. His name is a Spanish insult that one would say to a Chinese person. His name is based on his daughter's name, rather than the name of the Naruto character that he is based on.
 Clara Pichabrava - The father of Clara Pichamaru, he is a parody of Shikaku Nara. His name is based on his son's name, rather than the name of the Naruto character that he is based on. "Picha brava" in Spanish means a "wild" penis.
 Achimichi Gordo - The father of Gordi, he is a parody of Choza Akimichi. "Gordo" in Spanish means "fat." His name is based on his son's name, rather than the name of the Naruto character that he is based on.
 Professor Charruka - Raruto's mentor. He is a parody of Iruka Umino. His name refers to "Charruca," a brand of pipes that was sold in Spain.
 Gorrino Ibike - A parody of Ibiki Morino. "Ibike" has no intended meaning, while in Spanish a "Gorrino" is a pig.
 Torrojamaru - A parody of Konohamaru Sarutobi. His name derivation originates from that of Torroja Village.
 Anka - A parody of Anko Mitarashi. In Spanish an "anka" is a buttock.

Other characters
 Rata del Desierto - A parody of Gaara. The name is Spanish for "Rat of the Desert."
 Kankulo - A parody of Kankuro. In Spanish "can" refers to a dog, and "culo" refers to buttocks, so the name refers to the buttocks of a dog.
 Teresa María "Teremari" - A parody of Temari.
 Karasusto - A parody of Karasu. In Spanish "cara" refers to a face and "susto" means fright, so the name means "frightening face."
 Kabutops - A parody of Kabuto Yakushi. In the Pokémon series of games "Kabutops" is an evolution of the "Kabuto."
 Chochimaru - A parody of Orochimaru. In Spanish "chochi" is a slang word for a vagina.
 Kuchilla Ichahi - A parody of Itachi Uchiha. In Spanish "Cachi" means "groovy."
 Zatuna - A parody of Tazuna. The Raruto character's name is a mix-up of the original Naruto character's name.
 Gato - A parody of Gato. In Spanish "Gato" means cat, so the Raruto character is cat-like.
 Cagarruta - A parody of Gamabunta. The Spanish word "Cagarruta" refers to feces.
 Merluza - A parody of Zabuza Momochi. The Spanish word "merluza" refers to the fish "hake."
 Hamtaro is a parody of Haku. The character is in the form of a hamster, and the name originates from the character Hamtaro of the storybook and anime series Hamtaro.
 Chin-Chin - A parody of Kin Tsuchi. "Chin-Chin" is the Spanish equivalent of the English word "cheers!" used before drinking beverages during special occasions.
 Teriyaki - A parody of Shigure. "Teriyaki" refers to the Japanese cooking technique teriyaki.
 Coyote - A parody of Hayate Gekko. The name refers to the animal coyote.
 Yorkoi - A parody of Yoroi Akado. The name refers to the york ham.
 Kazuma "Sweat Bread" - A parody of Zaku Abumi. The name is a reference to Kazuma Azuma, the main character of Yakitate!! Japan.
 Ourugui - A parody of Misumi Tsurugi. In Spanish "Oruga" is "slug," so "orugui" would be like "sluggie."
 Tresu Cuatrosu - A parody of Dosu Kinuta. In Spanish "dos," "tres," and "cuatro" are the words of numbers two, three, and four.
 Mogui and Huron - Parodies of Moegi and Udon. The names in Spanish mean "emo" and "ferret."
 Erizu - A parody of Ebisu. The name in Spanish means "hedgehog."
 Gema - A parody of Genma Shiranui. In Spanish a "gema" is a gem.
 Pachon - A parody of Pakkun. "Pachon" is a common Spanish nickname.
 Chema - A parody of Enma. "Chema" is a common and colloquial Spanish nickname derived from the name "José María" or "José Manuel".
 Ra-chan - A parody of Gamakichi. In Spanish a "rana" is a frog.
 Lobomaru - A parody of Kuromaru. In Spanish a "lobo" is a wolf.
 Kuchilla Bobito - A parody of Obito Uchiha. In Spanish a "bobito" is a "little fool."

See also

 List of Naruto characters

References

Raruto